Mairie d'Ivry is a station of the Paris Métro, serving Line 7 in the commune of Ivry-sur-Seine, opened on 1 May 1946, when the line was extended from Porte d'Ivry. The station serves as the southeastern terminus of Paris Métro Line 7.

Station layout

Gallery

References

Paris Métro stations in Ivry-sur-Seine
Railway stations in France opened in 1946